Finley is an unincorporated community in Dyer County, Tennessee, United States. It is located roughly 5.5 miles west of downtown Dyersburg along Tennessee State Route 104. Tennessee State Route 182 also passes through the community, which connects it with Interstate 155 and Lenox to the north.

Originally known as Pleasant Hill, the community was settled through the 1840s on the high ground just north of the modern day village. The area surrounding Finley was hunted by Davy Crockett, who named the creek that runs through Finley after himself. In 1881 the post office was founded and the community was officially named Finley after a local businessman. Today, the village serves as a hub for the smaller communities of western Dyer County that lie within the Mississippi River alluvial plane. Finley has a post office, with ZIP code is 38030.

Demographics

Notes

Unincorporated communities in Dyer County, Tennessee
Unincorporated communities in Tennessee